Þróttur may refer to:
 Knattspyrnufélagið Þróttur, also known as Þróttur Reykjavík, a sports club based in Reykjavík, Iceland.
 Þróttur Neskaupstað, a multi-sport club based in Fjarðarbyggð, Iceland.
 Ungmennafélagið Þróttur, also known as Þróttur Vogum, a sports club based in Vogar, Iceland.